YFD may refer to:
 Brantford Airport, Ontario, Canada, IATA airport code
 Yard Floating Dock, US Navy